Number Ten Blues or Goodbye Saigon is a 1975 Japanese 35mm fujicolor film directed by . This movie, shot between December 1974 and April 1975, remained unfinished and was considered lost for many years. It was finally completed and released in 2013.

Plot
Saigon in February 1975, during the final stage of the Vietnam War, there is another story of love and violence. Japanese businessman Sugimoto (Yūsuke Kawazu) accidentally kills a Vietnamese man. He loses all title and social status that supported his wealthy position in Vietnam. He decides to escape from Vietnam. He heads North on the military road under battle conditions, with his lover, Lan (Thanh Lan), and Taro, who is the half-blood son of an ex-Japanese soldier and a Vietnamese woman since World War II. Who knows what awaits them: is it liberation or total catastrophe?

Production

Art
 Type : Action, adventure, crime, mystery, suspense
 Studio : Presario Corporation
 Music : Toshiaki Tsushima
 Theme song Paces of the rosy love (Bước tình hồng) by Nguyễn Trung Cang, with Thanh Lan's singing

Cast

 Yūsuke Kawazu ... Toshio Sugimoto - Japanese businessman
 Thanh Lan ... Lan - Saigonnese singer
  ... Taro - Sugimoto's partner
 Tú Trinh ... Hạnh
 Hidekazu Kikuchi ... Ota
 Eiichi Kikuchi
 Cao Huỳnh ... Huân
 Đoàn Châu Mậu ... Trần - Godfather
 Bảo Lâm
 Tùng Lâm

Awards

  24 January 2013 : International Film Festival Rotterdam
  2 August 2013 : Fantasia International Film Festival
  14 September 2013 : 
  5 October 2013 : War on Screen International Film Festival
  15 November 2013 : 
  23 March 2014 : Offscreen Film Festival
  12 April 2014 : Anaheim Viet Film Fest
  30 May 2014 : Frankfurt Nippon Connection Festival

Reception
This never-shown film was found in the basement of the National Film Center in Tokyo. Completely shot in Vietnam over 850 kilometers in the midst of the war. Location is Huế, Hải Vân Gorge, Road No. 1, Long Hải and Saigon.

See also
 Fall of Saigon
 Vietnam War

References

 
 
 Behind scenes of Goodbye Saigon - Lê Quang Thanh Tâm (Saigon Screen)
 ナンバーテン・ブルース さらばサイゴン – 日本映画情報システム （文化庁）
 ナンバーテン・ブルース さらばサイゴン – 映連データベース （日本映画製作者連盟）
 ナンバーテン・ブルース さらばサイゴン – 東京国立近代美術館フィルムセンター
 ナンバーテン・ブルース さらばサイゴン – 日本映画データベース
 Number Ten Blues – ロッテルダム国際映画祭 
 number10blues.com(archive) – 公式ウェブサイト
 Goodbye Saigon at the Viet Film Fest 1 2
 Goodbye Saigon – Phim truyện màu công chiếu khắp thế giới
 Tài tử Thanh Lan đến Nhật : Bộ phim Goodbye Saigon đoạt Audience Award 2013
 Vocalist Thanh Lan with movie Goodbye Saigon
 Goodbye Saigon in singer Thanh Lan's memory

1975 films
1970s multilingual films
1975 drama films
Japanese action films
Japanese adventure films
Japanese neo-noir films
Japanese crime films
2010s Japanese-language films
Japanese multilingual films
Vietnamese drama films
Vietnamese neo-noir films
Vietnamese-language films
Vietnamese crime films
Vietnam War films
Films set in Saigon
1970s English-language films
1970s Japanese films
2010s Japanese films
Rediscovered Japanese films
1970s rediscovered films